Julius Ailio  (19 July 1872 – 4 March 1933) was a Finnish archaeologist and a Social Democratic politician. He was a member of the Senate of Finland. He was born in Loppi, and died in Helsinki, aged 60.

1872 births
1933 deaths
People from Loppi
People from Häme Province (Grand Duchy of Finland)
Social Democratic Party of Finland politicians
Finnish senators
Ministers of Education of Finland
Members of the Parliament of Finland (1919–22)
Members of the Parliament of Finland (1924–27)
Members of the Parliament of Finland (1927–29)
Members of the Parliament of Finland (1929–30)
Members of the Parliament of Finland (1930–33)
Finnish archaeologists
University of Helsinki alumni
Academic staff of the University of Helsinki